K. K. Veerappan (1944/1945 – 15 June 2022) was an Indian politician.

He was elected to the Tamil Nadu Legislative Assembly from the Kapilamalai constituency in the 1996 elections. He was a candidate of the Dravida Munnetra Kazhagam (DMK) party.

The DMK denied him the opportunity to contest the 2001 elections and later suspended him for alleged anti-party activities.

References 

1940s births
2022 deaths
Tamil Nadu MLAs 1996–2001
Dravida Munnetra Kazhagam politicians
Year of birth missing
Tamil Nadu politicians
People from Namakkal district